Black Forest Metal is the seventh full-length album by American industrial metal band Hanzel und Gretyl. It was released via Metropolis Records on November 11, 2014. The album was successfully funded via a PledgeMusic crowdfunding campaign on June 26, 2014.

Track listing 
(Note: Songs are out of order on the back sleeve of CD case, but inside the booklet they are in the proper order. Listed here is the proper order.)

Personnel 
 Kaizer von Loopy – vocals, guitar, programming
 Vas Kallas – lead vocals, bass

References

External links 
Official Hanzel und Gretyl website
Official MySpace page
Metropolis Records

Hanzel und Gretyl albums
2014 albums
Metropolis Records albums
German-language albums